The 1930–31 Campionat de Catalunya season was the 32nd since its establishment and was played between 21 September and 23 November 1930.

Overview before the season
Six teams joined the Division One league, including three that would play the 1930–31 La Liga and three from the 1930–31 Tercera División.

From La Liga
Barcelona
Espanyol
Europa

From Tercera División
Badalona
Júpiter
Sabadell

Division One

League table

Results

Top goalscorers

Relegation playoff

Tiebreak

Division Two

League table

Promotion league

Copa Catalunya seasons
1930–31 in Spanish football